Cyrille Maret (born 11 August 1987) is a French judoka.

He won a bronze medal at the 2016 Summer Olympics in Rio de Janeiro, in the men's 100 kg.

References

External links
 

1987 births
Living people
Sportspeople from Dijon
French male judoka
Olympic judoka of France
Judoka at the 2016 Summer Olympics
Olympic medalists in judo
Olympic bronze medalists for France
Medalists at the 2016 Summer Olympics
Universiade medalists in judo
Mediterranean Games silver medalists for France
Mediterranean Games medalists in judo
Competitors at the 2009 Mediterranean Games
Universiade gold medalists for France
Judoka at the 2015 European Games
European Games medalists in judo
European Games gold medalists for France
European Games bronze medalists for France
Medalists at the 2009 Summer Universiade
21st-century French people